The fifth season of I'm a Celebrity...Get Me Out of Here was commissioned by Network 10 on 10 September 2018. It launched on 13 January 2019 and was hosted by Julia Morris and Chris Brown. The series ended after 33 days on 13 February 2019 and a pre-recorded finale, won by Richard Reid, was aired on 17 February 2019.

Celebrities

Celebrity guests

Results and elimination
 Indicates that the celebrity received the most votes from the public
 Indicates that the celebrity was immune from the vote
 Indicates that the celebrity was named as being in the bottom 2 or 3.
  Indicates that the celebrity received the fewest votes and was eliminated immediately (no bottom three)

Tucker trials
The contestants take part in daily trials to earn food. These trials aim to test both physical and mental abilities. Success is determined by a team winning the trial, with the winning team getting a large meal to share and the losing team getting small portions of rice and beans. If a participant in the trial says I'm A Celebrity, Get Me Out of Here! in the trial, the other team automatically wins.

 The public voted for who they wanted to face the trial
 The contestants decided who did which trial
 The trial was compulsory and neither the public nor celebrities decided who took part 
 The contestants were chosen by the evicted celebrities
 The voting for the trial was of dual origin - see note for details.

{| class="wikitable" style="margin:auto; text-align:center;"
|-
! scope="col" | Trialnumber
! scope="col" | Air date
! scope="col" | Name of trial
! scope="col" | Celebrity participation
! scope="col" | Number of stars/Winner(s)
! scope="col" | Notes
! scope="col" | Source
|- style="background:lightgreen
| 1
| 13 January
| Snakes and a Plane
| Everyone
| Red Team (Campers)
| 1
|
|- style="background:#99CCFF
| 2
| 14 January
| Flying Helicopters
| Ajay (red team) & Richard (blue team)
| Richard (blue team)
| None
|
|- style="background:#FFFF99
| 3
| 15 January
| A Frost Fight
| Angie (blue team) & Justin (red team)
| Justin (red team)
| None
|
|- style="background:#FFFF99
| 4
| 16 January
| Breakfast in Bed
| Jacqui & Justin (red team) and Justine & Natasha (blue team)
| Jacqui & Justin (red team)
| None
|
|- style="background:#FFFF99
| 5
| 17 January
| Basket Fall
| Luke (blue team) & Justin (red team)
| Luke (blue team)
| None
|
|- style="background:#FFFF99
| 6
| 20 January
| The Sunday Slam (1)
| Tahir (blue team) & Justin (red team)
| Tahir (blue team)
| None
|
|- style="background:lightgrey
| 7
| 21 January
| Tunnel Vision
| Shane & Justin
| 
| 2
|
|- style="background:#FFFF99
| 8
| 22 January
| Meal of Fortune
| Justin, Dermott, Sam & Shane
| 
| None
|
|- style="background:#FFaaaa
| 9
| 23 January
| Drop n' Pop
| Yvie & Angie
| 
| 3
|
|- style="background:#FFFF99
| 10
| 24 January
| Shocking Shopping
| Natasha, Luke, Justin & Richard
| 
| None
|
|- style="background:#FFFF99
| 11
| 27 January
| The Sunday Slam (2)
| Justin & Jacqui
| 
| 4
|
|- style="background:#FFaaaa
| 12
| 28 January
| Trubble Bath
| Shane, Natasha, Richard & Justine
| 
| None
|
|- style="background:#FFFF99
| 13
| 29 January
| Escape From The Viper Room
| Luke & Yvie
| 
| None
|
|- style="background:#FFFF99
| 14
| 30 January
| Groundhog Day
| Justin & Shane
| 
| None
|
|- style="background:#FFFF99
| 15
| 31 January
| Scrotal Recall
| Tahir & Katherine
| 
| None
|
|- style="background:#FFFF99
| 16
| 3 February
| The Sunday Slam (3)
| Katherine & Justin
| 
| None
|
|- style="background:#ffaaaa
| 17
| 4 February
| Bogged Down
| Richard
| 
| None
|
|- style="background:#ffaaaa
| 18
| 5 February
| Kindy Surprise
| Luke, Angie & Yvie
| 
| None
|
|- style="background:#ffaaaa
| 19
| 6 February
| Last Gasp
| Shane
| 
| None
|
|- style="background:#ffaaaa
| 20
| 7 February
| Spew Tube
| Natasha, Justin & Richard
| 
| None
|
|- style="background:lightgreen
| 21
| 10 February
| The Sunday Slam (Final- 4)
| Everyone
| 
| 5
|
|- style="background:#ffaaaa
| 22
| 11 February
| Deep Trouble
| Richard & Luke
| 
| None
|
|- style="background:lightgreen
| 23
| 12 February
| Help From Our Friends| Everyone
| 
|None|
|- style="background:lightgreen
| 24
| 17 February
| Friendly Fire
| Everyone and their family members
| 
| 6|
|-
|}

Notes
The celebrities were split into two teams, the red team and the blue team. These teams were chosen by the team leaders, Jacqui Lambie (red) and Richard Reid (blue), with Lambie choosing first as she won in a competition between them. The red and blue teams went head-to-head against each other in the immunity challenge. 
Shane was automatically placed into the trial as an intruder. Justin was voted into the trial by the public. The trial consisted of two identical tunnels filled with rats, gunk and cockroaches, with Justin being in one that is lit and Shane being in a dark one without lights. Justin had to tell Shane how to get the stars which were in different 'puzzles' around the tunnel.
The tucker trial was sponsored by Origin and Angie & Yvie were not only competing for meals for their camp but also for the camp to be 'powered up'. Angie was suspended in the air above the dam and Yvie had to control her by using a pulley system with a rope. Five helium filled balloons, the final being a 'jackpot balloon', were below the celebrities and Angie had to pop them with a wooden spear by being manoeuvred into place by Yvie and 'dropped' towards the balloons. She had to pop the balloons while being 'dropped' to win the star. The two only popped one balloon, but as it was the 'jackpot balloon' it gave them the opportunity to power the camp, and they were able to use electrical appliances like a pedestal fan, microwaves and a kettle for an hour 'of power'.
During the Boulder Dash section of the second Sunday Slam, Jacqui bumped her head while the 'boulder' was rolling over her and sustained a large lump to her forehead. As a safety precaution, the next day she visited the hospital for a CT scan and was cleared by the doctors.
The final Sunday Slam was an 'all in' trial. Yvie was ruled out on medical grounds so instead of running the course she commentated with Chris and Julia. Justin had to do the challenge blindfolded, along with the rest of the celebrities, and had to collect 10 mini action figures of himself along the obstacle course.
The celebrities were reunited with their family members during this episode as it was their last day in the jungle. The family members were able to participate in the tucker trial with the celebrities with one of more of them manoeuvring a 'loop' through a buzz-wire course where they couldn't touch the wires. If they did, their celebrity would be zapped with electricity from electrodes. The celebrities earned all three 'superstars' which earned them and all of their families and friends dinner, which included chips, meat, bread and vegetables.

Star count
This star count includes points (where able to be counted) from the first few weeks of camps. In all other aspects, it is a normal star count.

The Sunday Slam
In the fifth season, the Sunday Slam was introduced, in which every Sunday a celebrity would have to complete a large and hilarious obstacle course. These courses were sometimes completed 'head-to-head' against another celebrity who was in another team. If the celebrity completed the course they would win a 'slam' of meals for their celebrities and if they didn't they would go away with very little food or nothing. The new tucker trial was split into two main parts - The Course and The Slammer. The time spend on the gauntlet determined how steep the Slammer would be. The There were a number of challenges in the obstacle course, including a slippery slide, an 'electric forest', a spinning turntable, the twin spinning logs, a 'mole hole', a 'feathering' chamber, and the 'boulder dash'.

Team captains/camp leader

Immunity challenges
In Season 5 immunity challenges were introduced for the first time ever. These challenges granted the celebrity who won the challenge with 'uneliminatability' and therefore couldn't voted out of the jungle by the public.

Celebrity Chest challenges
Two or more celebrities are chosen to take part in the "Celebrity Chest" challenge to win luxuries for camp. Each challenge involves completing a task to win a chest to take back to camp. However, to win the luxury item in the chest, the campmates must correctly answer a question. If they fail to answer correctly, the luxury item is forfeited and a joke prize is won. This process is used in 'most' of the Chest Challenges. The luxury item is "donated" by a celebrity from the outside, mostly one who previously competed on a previous season.

 The celebrities got the question correct
 The celebrities got the question wrong

Notes
Shane and Dermott had to lie about their safari that they took in the jungle as they couldn't tell the other celebrities about their challenge. Instead they made up the story that they had to be 'dung beetles', with Shane being inside a 'dung ball' and Dermott pushing him. They put mud all over themselves to convince the celebrities that they had actually become 'dung beetles'. The celebrities' joke prize for not correctly answering the question was a pillow with Shannon Noll's face on it but as Shane and Dermott had made up the best lie and all of the celebrities believed it they were all given gin and tonic, potato crisps & biltong.

Secret Missions
This is a challenge where celebrities have to take part in something without alerting the other celebrities to what they are doing.

Jacqui's Secret Challenge: Junk in Your Trunk
In episode 10, Jacqui had to wear pants which had a magnet at the bottom. She had to collect at least five metal objects using only the magnet attached to the pants and make sure that the other celebrities didn't discover her secret.

Jacqui collected a pipe-cleaner from the dishwashing area and some pieces of cutlery as she knew where they were after working with Justine as sous-chef the previous day. The reward for completing the challenge was marshmallows for the whole camp which they could melt over the fire.

Yvie's Secret Challenge: Complement Justine
In episode 12, Yvie had to secretly get all of the celebrities to complement Justine on anything but her cooking. If they could complete the challenge without Justine realising they would win. The reward for completing the challenge was a selection of salts and spices which they could use to spice up their meals.

Natasha and Richard's Secret Challenge: Tim Tam Slam

In episode 21, Natasha and Richard were given the challenge to secretly complete a Tim Tam Slam each without their fellow celebrities catching them in the act. While one of them was completing their Tim Tam Slam the other was allowed to distract the rest of the camp. Natasha went first followed by Richard. The two of them were successful hence winning the rest of the camp three packets of Tim Tams.

The Camp's Secret Mission: Monkey Business

In episode 22, all of the camp mates (except for Justin) were given 'monkey masks' with the goal to wear it as much as possible without Justin finding out or asking what they were doing. The camp mates were successful in their challenge and won a bowl of 'Lillie bananas'.

Saturday Schoolies
In addition to the fifth season of I'm A Celebrity, another show hosted by Scott Tweedie aired on Network 10 on Saturdays at 7 pm called I'm A Celebrity: 'Saturday Schoolies'''. 
This hour-long show involves all of the celebrities currently in the jungle and is described as a 'jungle detention'. Tweedie will give assignments, in the form of 'fun' games, to the celebrities which will push all of the celebrities to their limits. The show will be filmed in camp and the celebrities will be completing their tasks for a 'golden lunchbox', which had a number of school snacks inside including an apple, dried mango, a muesli bar, biscuits, chips, chicken, a cheese & lettuce sandwich as well as juice.

Ratings

Ratings data is from OzTAM and represents the live and same day average viewership from the 5 largest Australian metropolitan centres (Sydney, Melbourne, Brisbane, Perth and Adelaide).
The Grand Final was aired on 17 February but was filmed on the 13 February and with held to the Sunday for scheduling.

References

05
2019 Australian television seasons